MGJ is the IATA code for Orange County Airport in New York, U.S.

MGJ may also refer to:

 mgj, ISO 639-3 language code for Abureni language
 MG J-type, a sports car produced from 1932 to 1934

See also
Mor Gregorios Jacobite Students' Movement